The Kanatuashuekanutsh River is a tributary of Kanishushteu River, flowing into the unorganized territory of Lac-Ashuapmushuan, in the Le Domaine-du-Roy Regional County Municipality, in the administrative region of Saguenay–Lac-Saint-Jean, in province of Quebec, in Canada.

A few secondary logging roads serve the Kanatuashuekanutsh River Valley. These roads connect indirectly to route 167 which is located to the southwest.

Forestry (mainly forestry) is the main economic activity in this valley; second, recreational tourism activities. The course of this river crosses entirely the Ashuapmushuan Wildlife Reserve.

Geography 
The Kanatuashuekanutsh River originates from the mouth of Sanicles Lake. This lake is enclosed between the mountains in a forest zone.

The mouth of Lac des Sanicles is located in a forest zone in the unorganized territory of Lac-Ashuapmushuan, at:
  north-west of the mouth of the Kanishushteu River;
  northeast of Chigoubiche Lake.

  towards the east in an increasingly deep valley, collecting the discharge (coming from the north-west) of Lake Levaux, to the discharge (coming from the north-west) from Lake Salignac;
  eastward crossing a forest plain, collecting the discharge (coming from the north-west) of a small lake, up to its mouth.

The Kanatuashuekanutsh River empties onto the southwest bank of the Kanishushteu River. This confluence is located at:
  west of the course of the Ashuapmushuan River
  northwest of downtown Saint-Félicien.

Toponymy 
The toponym “rivière Kanatuashuekanutsh” was made official on December 2, 1982, at the Place Names Bank of the Commission de toponymie du Québec.

See also 
 Le Domaine-du-Roy Regional County Municipality
 Ashuapmushuan Wildlife Reserve
 Ashuapmushuan River
 Kanishushteu River
 List of rivers of Quebec

References 

Rivers of Saguenay–Lac-Saint-Jean
Le Domaine-du-Roy Regional County Municipality